Immunology & Cell Biology is an academic journal of the Australian and New Zealand Society for Immunology covering  basic immunology research. The journal has a focus on cellular immunology, innate and adaptive immunity, immune responses to pathogens, tumour immunology, immunopathology, immunotherapy, immunogenetics and immunological studies in humans and model organisms (including mouse, rat, Drosophila etc.). The journal was founded in 1924 as the Australian Journal of Experimental Biology and Medical Science, and was converted in 1987 to Immunology and Cell Biology, making it one of the oldest speciality immunology journals in existence. Major historical contributions including publication by Donald Metcalf of the strategy for identifying colony-stimulating factors (CSFs) and the development of the clonal selection theory by Frank Macfarlane Burnet, in a series of more than 90 publications in the 1970s.

The journal's editor-in-chief is Adrian Liston, with Jonathan Coquet, James Harris, Kate Lawlor, Michelle Linterman, and Fabio Luciani serving as deputy editors. Ashraful Haque and Joanne Reed are News & Commentary Editors, with Jessica Borger as Immunology Futures Editor. 

ICB has a sister journal, Clinical and Translational Immunology, which was founded in 2012 in response to a growing need for publishing clinically-orientated research papers in the field of immunology.

Both ASI journals, Immunology & Cell Biology and  Clinical & Translational Immunology, offer prestigious awards to authors such as Publication of the Year Awards and Social Impact Awards. Each year, the ASI Annual Scientific Meeting hosts a dedicated workshop session to recognise the authors of top papers published in CTI and ICB.

References

English-language journals
Monthly journals